Annie Haslam (born 8 June 1947) is an English vocalist, songwriter and painter. She is best known as the lead singer of progressive rock band Renaissance since 1971, and for her long and diverse solo singing career. She has a five-octave vocal range. From 2002, Haslam has developed a parallel career as a visual artist, producing paintings on canvas, painted musical instruments and giclées.

Early history
Originally a fashion student in Cornwall, Haslam worked for a Savile Row tailor in London.  While there, she listened to the Beatles rooftop concert. She later began studying under opera singer Sybil Knight in 1970.

Career with Renaissance
In February 1971, Haslam became the new lead singer of Renaissance, after answering an advertisement in the British periodical Melody Maker, and auditioning for the band in Surrey.
Charles Snider stated: "Annie Haslam's voice, soaring high along with the melody, is the big news. Far more West End than Carnaby Street, it would come to define the band."

With Renaissance, Haslam was lead vocalist on seven studio albums during their classic period (1972–1979), four studio albums from 1981–present, and a number of live albums.

In August 1978 the band's single "Northern Lights" reached the top 10 in the UK singles charts.

Solo career
In 1977, Haslam began her solo career with her album Annie in Wonderland, produced by Roy Wood, who played most of the musical instruments,  duetted with her on one track, and performed on the Intergalactic Touring Band album. She has since released eight studio albums, three of which were released through her own record label, White Dove. Haslam has also collaborated with Steve Howe on a number of projects.
Her 2006 Live Studio Concert, was also released as her first solo DVD. Haslam released an EP called Night and Day, her first solo recording for some years, with Welsh rock band Magenta in 2006.

Visual arts
"Haslam as few among us, is blessed to channel her muse in a variety of ways" wrote Melinda Rizzo in Fine Art Magazine. One of these is visual arts:
 her paintings have been used as cover art on the albums:
 One Enchanted Evening, by Annie Haslam 
 Woman Transcending by Annie Haslam – 
 Night and Day by Annie Haslam with Magenta
 Grandine il Vento / Symphony of Light by Renaissance 
 Speak by I and Thou
 Song of Times by Starcastle
 she has helped others to design her on-stage clothing
 she has painted musical instruments including guitars, and violins
 she has created giclées of many of her paintings
 in 1975 she artistically hand-lettered the lyrics to "Mother Russia" for a British tour program.

Festive season concert
Starting in 1999, Haslam has, each year, performed a Christmas show called In the Spirit of the Holidays, originally at the Upper Tinicum Lutheran Church, and then at the larger Sellersville Theatre in Sellersville, Pennsylvania, since 2006. The Christmas show has been held every year except 2012, due to the death of her friend and colleague, Michael Dunford, in November of that year. Haslam stated that "there was just too much sadness at the time." Included in the program are secular, and religious Christmas carols, as well as her own compositions, and some Renaissance songs.

Personal life

Haslam has been a vegetarian since the late 1980s. In 1993, Haslam was diagnosed with breast cancer, which she survived and which became the inspiration for her 1994 album, Blessing in Disguise.

Haslam was engaged to musician Roy Wood for four years, which she later described as "four of the funniest years of my life". In 1991, Haslam married Marc I. Hoffman of North Wales, Pennsylvania. The marriage ended in divorce. She now resides in Bucks County, Pennsylvania.

Solo discography
1977: Annie in Wonderland
1985: Still Life
1989: Annie Haslam
1994: Blessing in Disguise
1995: Supper's Ready: (Genesis tribute Album) (guest vocalist) 
1995: Tales From Yesterday (Yes tribute Album) (guest vocalist)
1998: Live Under Brazilian Skies
1999: The Dawn of Ananda
1999: Portraits of Bob Dylan by Steve Howe (album) (guest vocalist)
2000: It Snows in Heaven Too
2002: One Enchanted Evening
2005: Icon by John Wetton & Geoff Downes (album) (guest vocalist)
2006: Miles of Music by Bob Miles (guest vocalist)
2006: Live Studio Concert
2006: Night and Day EP with Magenta written for Haslam by Rob Reed and Christina Booth
2007: Woman Transcending
2012: Songs of the Century: (Supertramp tribute Album) (guest vocalist)
2014: 'Live' Studio Concert Philadelphia 1997 (Re-release)
2017: Don't Give Up Single, duet with Jann Klose

References

External links
AnnieHaslam.com – Official website – (Including a gallery of Haslam's art)
Annie Haslam's Facebook page
Renaissance – Official page
Annie Haslam Interview with Alison Steele, August 1989
Fine Art Magazine article on Haslam's art

1947 births
Living people
English songwriters
English rock singers
Women rock singers
Progressive rock musicians
Singers with a five-octave vocal range
20th-century English painters
21st-century English painters
Musicians from Manchester
Musicians from the Metropolitan Borough of Bolton
English expatriates in the United States
People from Bucks County, Pennsylvania
20th-century English women artists
21st-century English women artists
20th-century English women singers
20th-century English singers
21st-century English women singers
21st-century English singers
English sopranos
Renaissance (band) members